This page describes the qualifying procedure for the 1985 UEFA European Under-16 Football Championship. 25 teams were divided into 12 groups of two and three teams each. The twelve winners advanced to the final tournament.

Results

Group 1

Group 2

Group 3
Norway was the only team in this group.

Group 4

Group 5

Group 6

Group 7

Group 8

Group 9

Group 10

Group 11
Bulgaria was the only team in this group.

Group 12

Notes

References
UEFA.com
RSSSF.com

Qualifying
UEFA European Under-17 Championship qualification